The 2014–15 Florida Gulf Coast Eagles women's basketball team will represent Florida Gulf Coast University (FGCU) in the 2014–15 NCAA Division I women's basketball season. The Eagles were coached by 13th year head coach Karl Smesko and were members of the Atlantic Sun Conference. They finish the season 31–3, 14–0 in A-Sun play to win the Atlantic Sun regular season title. They also won the Atlantic Sun Tournament to earn an automatic to the 2015 NCAA Division I women's basketball tournament where they lost to Florida State in the second round.

Media
All home games and conference road will be shown on ESPN3 or A-Sun.TV. Road games will also be broadcast on the FGCU Portal.

Roster

Schedule

|-
!colspan=9 style="background:#00885A; color:#00287A;"| Regular season

|-
!colspan=9 style="background:#00885A; color:#00287A;"| Atlantic Sun Tournament

|-
!colspan=9 style="background:#00885A; color:#00287A;"| NCAA Women's tournament

Rankings

See also
 2014–15 Florida Gulf Coast Eagles men's basketball team

References

Florida Gulf Coast
Florida Gulf Coast Eagles women's basketball seasons
Florida Gulf Coast